James Jerold Koedatich (born June 12, 1948) is an American serial killer who was sentenced to death for the killings of two women in Morris County, New Jersey, which he committed during the final months of 1982, after having been previously paroled for the 1971 murder of his roommate in Florida. Koedatich had killed a fellow inmate in 1973, but that was ruled to be self-defense.

Murders

Florida 
In 1971, Koedatich was living in Dade County, Florida. On June 13, Koedatich killed his roommate, 40-year-old Robert Anderson. He was quickly arrested and convicted of second degree murder. Koedatich  received a 15-year prison sentence and was sent to the Florida State Prison in Raiford. While in prison, he was accused of killing a fellow inmate, but this was ruled as self defense, and Koedatich was not charged. In 1982, having spent eleven years in prison, the Florida Parole Board granted Koedatich parole, and in August he was officially released from prison. After his release he moved to Morristown, New Jersey.

New Jersey    
On November 23, 1982 Koedatich came across 18-year-old Amie Hoffman. Hoffman, a cheerleader for Parsippany Hills High School, was leaving her job at a mall in Hanover Township, when Koedatich kidnapped her into his vehicle. Once in a secluded location, he sexually assaulted Hoffman before stabbing her to death, then disposing of her body in the Mendham Reservoir in Randolph Township. Her body was transported by the naturally moving water into a water holding tank, where it would be found two days later. During the subsequent autopsy, semen belonging to Hoffman's killer was located in her body. There were eyewitnesses who were found in the investigation, and they gave a description of the vehicle that the suspect drove. Police also located tire tracks the killer's car left behind.

On December 5, 1982, Koedatich abducted another woman, this time 25-year-old Deirdre O'Brian at knife point after running her off the road after a small chase. Once at an Interstate 80 rest area, he raped, and stabbed her repeatedly before leaving the area. O'Brian was found alive on the side of the road, and was rushed to the hospital where she died.

Arrest 
In January 1983, Koedatich brought himself to the investigators' attention by claiming he was stabbed by a female individual while driving alone at night. As part of regular police procedure, they seized to question him about the attack, at this point realizing there was likely a serial killer active in New Jersey, thinking that Koedatich was a surviving victim. Detectives soon noticed Koedatich's car matched the description of the car seen abducting Hoffman, as well as his tires corresponding with tire tracks found at the scene. At first thinking it might just be a coincidence, they inspected Koedatich's wounds, but in a turn of events, it was found that the wounds were self-inflicted. They also found out his original conviction for the 1971 killing of his roommate. Koedatich, now a suspect, claimed that he was driving around the area Hoffman was abducted in the night of her murder, but a few days later on May 12, he was arrested by authorities, and charged with two counts of murder.

Trials and imprisonment 
Both trials for Koedatich ended in guilty verdicts, despite his claims of innocence. He was sentenced to death, and resided on New Jersey's death row. However in 1990, Koedatich's case was brought forward by the Supreme Court of New Jersey, which overturned his original sentence, and he was resentenced to life imprisonment. In 2011, Koedatich contacted the heads of the State's Department of Corrections, requesting to be moved to a prison in Illinois to be closer to his family, however Commissioner Gary Lanigan rejected the proposal. In 2017, Koedatich communicated with the Innocence Project, requesting with discovery of new DNA evidence could be used to clear his name. In the meantime, Koedatich remains in a New Jersey prison, with the latest parole date set for 2038, when he would be 90 years old.

In media 
Koedatich's crimes are featured in the episode "Fatal Error" on the television show The New Detectives.

See also 
 List of serial killers in the United States

References 

1948 births
Living people
20th-century American criminals
American male criminals
Male serial killers
American people convicted of murder
American prisoners sentenced to life imprisonment
People convicted of murder by New Jersey
Prisoners sentenced to life imprisonment by New Jersey
Prisoners sentenced to death by New Jersey
People from Miami-Dade County, Florida
People from Morristown, New Jersey